Jorge Pedro Busti (18 October 1947 – 20 December 2021) was an Argentine politician who served as Justicialist Party governor and senator for Entre Ríos Province.

Life and career
Busti was born in Concordia, Entre Ríos on 18 October 1947, and graduated as a lawyer at the Universidad Nacional de Córdoba.

He served as Mayor of Concordia from 1983 to 1987, and was first elected governor in 1987. In 1991 he retired as governor and was once again elected Mayor of Concordia. From 1995 to 1999 Busti returned for a second term as governor, then in 1999 became a deputy in the Argentine Chamber of Deputies. In 2001, he was elected to the Argentine Senate, but stepped down in 2003 after being elected for a third term as governor.
Two of his former vice-governors have been investigated or prosecuted for corruption.

Busti played a leading role in the 2005/6 dispute between Argentina and Uruguay over the proposal to build a pulp mill across the river from Entre Ríos. In 2007 he stood down as Governor and was elected to the provincial Chamber of Deputies.

He was married with three children. His wife, Cristina Cremer de Busti, was a member of the Argentine Chamber of Deputies representing Entre Ríos between 2007 and 2017. Busti died following heart surgery on 20 December 2021, at the age of 74.

References

External links

Official site

1947 births
2021 deaths
People from Entre Ríos Province
Argentine people of Italian descent
National University of Córdoba alumni
20th-century Argentine lawyers
Governors of Entre Ríos Province
Mayors of places in Argentina
Members of the Argentine Chamber of Deputies elected in Entre Ríos
Members of the Argentine Senate for Entre Ríos
Justicialist Party politicians